Cubaris murina (commonly known as the little pillbug) is a species of woodlouse in the family Armadillidae. It is found in North America, Africa, South America, Australasia, tropical Asia, and the Pacific Ocean.

Cubaris murina is a species that conglobates.

Cubaris murina has become popular as a pet in the exotic animal hobby. They have practical applications in improving the health of terrariums by serving as a bioactive clean-up crew, and are also valued for the attractive appearance of some of its color morphs (slang for observed Polymorphism). Known morphs of Cubaris murina in hobbyist collections include:

 Papaya - A dull pink variety that is believed by some to be the expression of some form of albinism
 Glacier - An almost completely white variety of Cubaris murina
 Anemone

References

Isopoda
Articles created by Qbugbot
Crustaceans described in 1833